Yuda International Trade Center is a skyscraper in Zhengzhou, Henan, People's Republic of China.

See also
List of tallest buildings in China

References

Skyscrapers in Zhengzhou
Buildings and structures completed in 1998
1998 establishments in China
Skyscraper office buildings in China
Skyscraper hotels in China